Luiz Silva Filho (born 7 February 1983), known simply as Luiz, is a Brazilian professional footballer who plays as a goalkeeper for São Caetano.

In 2014, he went to Criciúma on loan from São Caetano.

In 2015, he signed a 4 year contract with Criciúma.

External links
Profile at Globo Esporte's Futpedia

1983 births
Living people
Brazilian footballers
Campeonato Brasileiro Série A players
Campeonato Brasileiro Série B players
Campeonato Brasileiro Série C players
Associação Desportiva São Caetano players
Mirassol Futebol Clube players
Criciúma Esporte Clube players
Oeste Futebol Clube players
Association football goalkeepers
People from Campo Grande
Sportspeople from Mato Grosso do Sul